Périgueux-Saint-Georges is a former railway station in Périgueux, Aquitaine, France. The station is located on the Coutras - Tulle railway line. The station was served by TER (local) services between Périgueux and Agen operated by SNCF. It was closed in 2017.

References

Railway stations in France opened in 1904
Defunct railway stations in Dordogne